Dammika Rajapakse (born 15 May 1971) is a Sri Lankan former cricketer who is now an umpire. He played in 146 first-class and 83 List A matches between 1988 and 2012. He made his Twenty20 debut on 17 August 2004, for Sri Lanka Police Sports Club in the 2004 SLC Twenty20 Tournament.

References

External links
 

1971 births
Living people
Sri Lankan cricketers
Burgher Recreation Club cricketers
Moors Sports Club cricketers
Moratuwa Sports Club cricketers
Sri Lanka Police Sports Club cricketers
Tamil Union Cricket and Athletic Club cricketers
Place of birth missing (living people)